Abortion in Qatar is illegal in some circumstances. Under Qatar's penal code, a woman who induces her abortion or who consents to an abortion faces up to five years' imprisonment. Individuals who perform an unauthorized abortion on a woman may face up to five years' imprisonment if she consents, and up to ten years if it is performed without her consent.

Historically, abortion was allowed in Qatar society only if the pregnancy was deemed to endanger the mother's life. Qatar's penal code ratified this convention in 1971 by legalizing abortion in cases where the mother's life would be saved. Furthermore, a law formalized in 1983 states that abortions may be legally performed on pregnancies of less than four months duration if the pregnancy were to cause serious harm to the mother's health if continued, or if there was evidence that the child would be born with untreatable mental or physical deficiencies and both parents consented to the abortion. 

Abortions must first be recommended by a medical commission comprising three specialists before it can be performed. By law, abortions must be performed in a government hospital.

Most abortions carried out by residents of Qatar are performed in the country itself rather than abroad. Abortions in Qatar are sometimes performed by women who are pregnant out of wedlock as a direct result of the illegality of giving birth to a child out of wedlock.

References

Qatar
Qatar
Health in Qatar
Women in Qatar
Women's rights in Qatar